The 1963 Florida Gators football team represented the University of Florida during the 1963 NCAA University Division football season. The season was Ray Graves' fourth as the head coach of the Florida Gators football team.  The Gators started their season 1–1–1, the Gators having eked out their single win over the Richmond Spiders (35–28).   Graves' 1963 Florida Gators won their last three games over the Georgia Bulldogs (21–14), Miami Hurricanes (27–21) and Florida State Seminoles (7–0) to finish 6–3–1 overall and 3–3–1 in the Southeastern Conference (SEC), placing seventh of twelve SEC teams.

Schedule

Primary source: 2015 Florida Gators Football Media Guide

Attendance figures: University of Florida 1964 Football Brochure.

References

Florida
Florida Gators football seasons
Florida Gators football